Bung Karno Seclusion House refers to two houses in Indonesia in which Sukarno lived in during his time in exile. On January 14, 1934 he was exiled in Ende, Flores, where he stayed from 1934 to 1938. His home in Ende is now a museum. After that, he was exiled to Bengkulu city, Bengkulu until 1942.

Exile House in Ende

Exile House in Bengkulu

References 

Sukarno
Houses in Indonesia